The Green Jacket (French: L'habit vert) is a 1937 French comedy film directed by Roger Richebé and starring Elvire Popesco, Victor Boucher and Jules Berry. It is based on a play by Gaston Arman de Caillavet and Robert de Flers. The film's sets were designed by the art director Jean d'Eaubonne.

The film is a farce set against the backdrop of the Académie française.

Cast
 Elvire Popesco as La duchesse de Maulévrier  
 Victor Boucher as Le comte Hubert de Latour-Latour 
 Jules Berry as Parmeline  
 André Lefaur as Le duc de Maulévrier  
 Pierre Larquey as Pinchet - le secrétaire perpétuel de l'Institut  
 Meg Lemonnier as Brigitte Touchard - la secrétaire du duc  
 Bernard Blier as Le fils Pinchet  
 Abel Tarride as Jacques Durand - le nouveau Président de la République  
 Robert Seller as Saint-Gobain 
 Palau as Le baron Bénin 
 Lucette Desmoulins as Arlette Mareuil  
 Marie-Jacqueline Chantal as La voyageuse du train  
 Léonce Corne as Le tailleur  
 Georges Morton as Le général  
 Charles Lamy as Gondrecourt - le doyen de l'Académie française  
 Georges Pally as Le domestique des Maulévrier 
 Léon Arvel as Mourier 
 Jacques Beauvais as L'huissier  
 Marguerite de Morlaye as Une invitée à l'Élysée 
 Eddy Debray as Laurel  
 Gustave Gallet as Petit rôle  
 Anthony Gildès as Un académicien  
 Léone Leduc as Petit rôle  
 Robert Ralphy as Un académicien  
 Henri Richard as Petit rôle  
 Gaston Secrétan as Un académicien

References

Bibliography 
 Forman, Edward. Historical Dictionary of French Theater. Scarecrow Press, 2010.

External links 
 

1937 films
French comedy films
1937 comedy films
1930s French-language films
Films directed by Roger Richebé
French films based on plays
Films set in Paris
Gaumont Film Company films
French black-and-white films
1930s French films